In mathematics and computer science, the Krohn–Rhodes theory (or algebraic automata theory) is an approach to the study of finite semigroups and automata that seeks to decompose them in terms of elementary components. These components correspond to finite aperiodic semigroups and finite simple groups that are combined in a feedback-free manner (called a "wreath product" or "cascade").

Krohn and Rhodes found a general decomposition for finite automata. In doing their research, though, the authors discovered and proved an unexpected major result in finite semigroup theory, revealing a deep connection between finite automata and semigroups.

Definitions and description of the Krohn–Rhodes theorem   
Let T be a semigroup. A semigroup S that is a homomorphic image of a subsemigroup of T is said to be a divisor of T.

The Krohn–Rhodes theorem for finite semigroups states that every finite semigroup S is a divisor of a finite alternating wreath product of finite simple groups, each a divisor of S, and finite aperiodic semigroups (which contain no nontrivial subgroups).

The new automaton A'      has the same input and output symbols as A. Here, both the states and inputs of the cascaded automata have a very special hierarchical coordinate form.

Moreover, each simple group (prime) or non-group irreducible semigroup (subsemigroup of the flip-flop monoid) that divides the transformation semigroup of A must divide the transformation semigroup of some component of the cascade, and only the primes that must occur as divisors of the components are those that divide A's transformation semigroup.

Group complexity
The Krohn–Rhodes complexity (also called group complexity or just complexity) of a finite semigroup S is the least number of groups in a wreath product of finite groups and finite aperiodic semigroups of which S is a divisor.

All finite aperiodic semigroups have complexity 0, while non-trivial finite groups have complexity 1. In fact, there are semigroups of every non-negative integer complexity. For example, for any n greater than 1, the multiplicative semigroup of all (n+1) × (n+1) upper-triangular matrices over any fixed finite field has complexity n (Kambites, 2007).

A major open problem in finite semigroup theory is the decidability of complexity: is there an algorithm that will compute the Krohn–Rhodes complexity of a finite semigroup, given its multiplication table?
Upper bounds and ever more precise lower bounds on complexity have been obtained (see, e.g. Rhodes & Steinberg, 2009). Rhodes has conjectured that the problem is decidable.

History and applications
At a conference in 1962, Kenneth Krohn and John Rhodes announced a method for decomposing a (deterministic) finite automaton into "simple" components that are themselves finite automata.  This joint work, which has implications for philosophy [citation or explanation needed], comprised both Krohn's doctoral thesis at Harvard University and Rhodes' doctoral thesis at MIT.<ref>Morris W. Hirsch, "Foreword to Rhodes' Applications of Automata Theory and Algebra".  In J. Rhodes, Applications of Automata Theory and Algebra: Via the Mathematical Theory of Complexity to Biology, Physics, Philosophy and Games", (ed. C. L. Nehaniv), World Scientific Publishing Co.,  2010.</ref>  Simpler proofs, and generalizations of the theorem to infinite structures, have been published since then (see Chapter 4 of Rhodes and Steinberg's 2009 book The q-Theory of Finite Semigroups for an overview).

In the 1965 paper by Krohn and Rhodes, the proof of the theorem on the decomposition of finite automata (or, equivalently sequential machines) made extensive use of the algebraic semigroup structure.  Later proofs contained major simplifications using finite wreath products of finite transformation semigroups. The theorem generalizes the Jordan–Hölder decomposition for finite groups (in which the primes are the finite simple groups), to all finite transformation semigroups (for which the primes are again the finite simple groups plus all subsemigroups of the "flip-flop" (see above)). Both the group and more general finite automata decomposition require expanding the state-set of the general, but allow for the same number of input symbols. In the general case, these are embedded in a larger structure with a hierarchical "coordinate system".

One must be careful in understanding the notion of "prime" as Krohn and Rhodes explicitly refer to their theorem as a "prime decomposition theorem" for automata. The components in the decomposition, however, are not prime automata (with prime defined in a naïve way); rather, the notion of prime is more sophisticated and algebraic: the semigroups and groups associated to the constituent automata of the decomposition are prime (or irreducible) in a strict and natural algebraic sense with respect to the wreath product (Eilenberg, 1976). Also, unlike earlier decomposition theorems, the Krohn–Rhodes decompositions usually require expansion of the state-set, so that the expanded automaton covers (emulates) the one being decomposed. These facts have made the theorem difficult to understand, and challenging to apply in a practical way—until recently, when computational implementations became available (Egri-Nagy & Nehaniv 2005, 2008).

H.P. Zeiger (1967) proved an important variant called the holonomy decomposition (Eilenberg 1976).  The holonomy method appears to be relatively efficient and has been implemented computationally by A. Egri-Nagy (Egri-Nagy & Nehaniv 2005).

Meyer and Thompson (1969) give a version of Krohn–Rhodes decomposition for finite automata that is equivalent to the decomposition previously developed by Hartmanis and Stearns, but for useful decompositions, the notion of expanding the state-set of the original automaton is essential (for the non-permutation automata case).

Many proofs and constructions now exist of Krohn–Rhodes decompositions (e.g., [Krohn, Rhodes & Tilson 1968], [Ésik 2000], [Diekert et al. 2012]), with the holonomy method the most popular and efficient in general (although not in all cases). Owing to the close relation between monoids and categories, a version of the Krohn–Rhodes theorem is applicable to category theory. This observation and a proof of an analogous result were offered by Wells (1980).

The Krohn–Rhodes theorem for semigroups/monoids is an analogue of the Jordan–Hölder theorem for finite groups (for semigroups/monoids rather than groups). As such, the theorem is a deep and important result in semigroup/monoid theory. The theorem was also surprising to many mathematicians and computer scientists since it had previously been widely believed that the semigroup/monoid axioms were too weak to admit a structure theorem of any strength, and prior work (Hartmanis & Stearns) was only able to show much more rigid and less general decomposition results for finite automata.

Work by Egri-Nagy and Nehaniv (2005, 2008–) continues to further automate the holonomy version of the Krohn–Rhodes decomposition extended with the related decomposition for finite groups (so-called Frobenius–Lagrange coordinates) using the computer algebra system GAP.

Applications outside of the semigroup and monoid theories are now computationally feasible.  They include computations in biology and biochemical systems (e.g. Egri-Nagy & Nehaniv 2008), artificial intelligence, finite-state physics, psychology, and game theory (see, for example, Rhodes 2009).

See also
 Semigroup action
 Transformation semigroup
 Green's relations

Notes

References

 
 
 
 Egri-Nagy, A.; and Nehaniv, C. L. (2005), "Algebraic Hierarchical Decomposition of Finite State Automata: Comparison of Implementations for Krohn–Rhodes Theory", in 9th International Conference on Implementation and Application of Automata (CIAA 2004), Kingston, Canada, July 22–24, 2004, Revised Selected Papers, Editors: Domaratzki, M.; Okhotin, A.; Salomaa, K.; et al.; Springer Lecture Notes in Computer Science, Vol. 3317, pp. 315–316, 2005
 
  Two chapters are written by Bret Tilson.
 
 
 
 
 Krohn, K. R.; and Rhodes, J. L. (1962), "Algebraic theory of machines", Proceedings of the Symposium on Mathematical Theory of Automata'' (editor: Fox, J.), (Wiley–Interscience)
 
 
 
 
 
 
 
 
 
  Erratum: Information and Control 11(4): 471 (1967), plus erratum.

Further reading

External links
 Prof. John L. Rhodes, University of California at Berkeley webpage
 SgpDec: Hierarchical Composition and Decomposition of Permutation Groups and Transformation Semigroups, developed by A. Egri-Nagy and C. L. Nehaniv.  Open-source software package for the GAP computer algebra system.
 
 An introduction to the Krohn-Rhodes Theorem (Section 5); part of the Santa Fe Institute Complexity Explorer MOOC Introduction to Renormalization, by Simon DeDeo.

Semigroup theory
Category theory
Finite automata